MLK Jr. (or ML King Jr.) is a Capital MetroRail commuter rail station in Austin, Texas.  It was built with a musical theme in mind and is located in East Austin at the corner of Martin Luther King Jr. Boulevard and Alexander Avenue, the former of which is in turn named after civil rights activist Martin Luther King Jr.

Transit connections
 #18 MLK Jr.
 #465 MLK Jr./University of Texas

References

External links
 MLK Jr. station overview
 MLK Jr. station map

Railway stations in the United States opened in 2010
Capital MetroRail stations in Austin
Railway stations in Travis County, Texas